Swansea Pride is the annual South West Wales LGBT festival which is held in Swansea, Wales.

2008 – Early days
In 2008 a group of local LGBT people organised themselves after discussing their mutual ambition to organise an outdoor Pride event in Swansea, Wales's second city. The organisers included the people behind local social media website, Gayswansea.com.  

There were no professional event organisers on the initial committee and the event was put together entirely by volunteers. Pink in the Park, the first event, took place on the Lacrosse Field, Singleton Park on 28 June 2009. 

The event was, in spite of doubts and trepidation, a resounding success, where Kelly Llorenna, Scooch and local entertainers entertained the crowd. The festival was also used as a way to raise money and awareness for the HIV and AIDS charity, Terrence Higgins Trust.

2011 – Becoming a registered charity
Emboldened by their success, and following the second Swansea Pride event in 2010, the events volunteers decided to constitute as a registered charity. The decision to become a charity was made to publicly demonstrate that Swansea Pride is a not-for-profit event run by volunteers for the benefit of the local LGBT community, their friends and families.

2013 – Charity name change
In 2013 the charity changed its name to Spectrum South West Wales while keeping the name Swansea Pride exclusively for the event. The reason for the name change was to allow the charity to undertake other events and activities for and on behalf of the local LGBT community.

2015 – Event cancelled
The seventh annual event, Swansea Pride 2015, was cancelled on 14 April 2015 Financial difficulties and a lack of volunteers were cited as the reasons the event was cancelled.

2016
On Friday 19 June 2015 a public meeting was held at the charity's office where a public vote decided to start planning and preparation for a Swansea Pride event in 2016.   A new contingent of volunteers were recruited to the event Organising Committee & its constituent sub-committees.

Historically, the event was held on the last Saturday in June each year.  However, since the relaunch of London Pride the decision was made to move to another date. The date for the 2016 event was scheduled to be 30 April 2016.  However the event did not happen.

2018 – Swansea Pride returns
On Saturday 5 May 2018, Swansea Pride returned at the National Waterfront Museum in Swansea.  The event was a great success and was supported by local people and politicians alike.

2019 – A Pride committee is set up
Swansea Pride is set to return in 2019 with Pride week in Swansea.  The event is planned on Saturday 4 May 2019 at the National Waterfront Museum and thanks to the help of sponsors and the support of Swansea Council, the future of Pride in Swansea looks promising.  Stars including Farrah Moan from Ru-Pauls Drag Race and Michelle Collins and rumoured to be supporting events in the lead up to Pride, including a same sex dance competition at the Brangwyn Hall, a variety performance at the Princess Royal Theatre and a cabaret night at Hyst con the city's High Street.

See also

List of LGBT events

References

External links
 Swansea Pride official website
 Swansea Pride Facebook page
 Swansea Pride Twitter

Mass media and culture in Swansea
LGBT organisations in Wales
Annual events in Wales
Pride parades in Wales
2008 in LGBT history